Aegomorphus gigas is a species of beetle in the family Cerambycidae. It was described by Galileo and Martins in 2012.

References

Aegomorphus
Beetles described in 2012